Canons Ashby House is a Grade I listed Elizabethan manor house located in the village of Canons Ashby, about  south of the town of Daventry in the county of Northamptonshire, England. It has been owned by the National Trust since 1981 when the house was close to collapse and the gardens had turned into a meadow. "The Tower" of the building is in the care of the Landmark Trust and available for holiday lets.

Design

The interior of Canons Ashby House is noted for its Elizabethan wall paintings and its Jacobean plasterwork. It has remained essentially unchanged since 1710 and is presented as it was during the time of Sir Henry Edward Leigh Dryden (1818–1899), a Victorian antiquary with an interest in history.

The house sits in the midst of a formal garden with colourful herbaceous borders, an orchard featuring varieties of fruit trees from the 16th century, terraces, walls and gate piers from 1710. There is also the remains of a medieval priory church (from which the house gets its name).

History

The house had been the home of the Dryden family since its construction in the 16th century; the manor house was built in approximately 1550 with additions in the 1590s, in the 1630s and 1710.

One John Dryden had married Elizabeth Cope in 1551 and inherited, through his wife, an L-shaped farmhouse which he gradually extended. In the 1590s his son, Sir Erasmus Dryden completed the final north range of the house which enclosed the Pebble Courtyard.

John Dryden and Elizabeth Cope had a daughter, Bridget Dryden (1563-1645),born at Canons Ashby.  She became the second wife of cleric and teacher Francis Marbury; their daughter Anne Hutchinson (1591-1643) emigrated to the Massachusetts Bay Colony in 1634. Anne's strong religious convictions were at odds with the established Puritan clergy in the Boston area, and her popularity and charisma helped create a theological schism that threatened to destroy the Puritans' religious community in New England. She was eventually tried and convicted, then banished from the colony with many of her supporters. To 19th century America, she was a crusader for religious liberty; in the 20th century, she became viewed as a feminist leader for her staunch defence of individual freedom of thought.  Today, a statue of Anne Hutchinson stands in front of the State House in Boston, Massachusetts.

Sir Henry Edward Leigh Dryden's daughter, the historian and photographer Alice Dryden (1866–1956) was born in the house and lived there for 33 years. She moved away after her father  died, since a woman could not inherit the estate and it went to her uncle, Sir Alfred Erasmus Dryden (1821–1912).

Louis Osman (1914–1996), an architect and accomplished British goldsmith lived at Canons Ashby from 1969/70 to 1979. Whilst there, Osman made the crown, with his enamellist wife, Dilys Roberts, which was used at the investiture of Charles, Prince of Wales in 1969. They also made the gold enamelled casket that held the Magna Carta which was on view in the United States Capitol, Washington, DC in 1976 for the United States Bicentennial.

During World War 2, the London offices of 20th Century Fox films were evacuated to Canons Ashby House; the evacuee staff lived in the nearby village of Moreton Pinkney.

Gervase Jackson-Stops, who was the Architectural Adviser to the National Trust for over twenty years, broke fresh ground when he fought for the rescue of the then decaying manor-house in the 1980s. This was the first time that the Trust used its charitable funds rather than the traditional family endowment to save a historic house.

References

External links

Canons Ashby House information at the National Trust

Gardens in Northamptonshire
Country houses in Northamptonshire
Historic house museums in Northamptonshire
National Trust properties in Northamptonshire
Grade I listed buildings in Northamptonshire
Grade I listed houses
Landmark Trust properties in England